Nightstalker is a Greek stoner metal band from Athens.

History 
Nightstalker are Argy (vocals), Andreas Lagios (bass), Tolis Motsios (guitar) and Dinos Roulos (drums). Formed in 1989 by the lead singer and drummer at the same time, Argy, Nightstalker have become popular in the underground rock scene as pioneers of the 'heavy rock' scene (later named as stoner rock) and have earned a cult following. Having a classic rock and metal background, and influenced by the grunge rock of the early 1990s, the band managed to combine the raw rock 'n roll simplicity with heavy riffs and hazy, psychedelic tunes. After some releases in several compilations (Toxic Babes in a Rock 'n Roll Land, Divin'), the band became well known after the release of the first EP, SideFX (1994), and the first album Use (1996). Followed by the third release, the EP The Ritual (2000), the main characteristic of the first decade was the combination of drums playing and lead singing by Argy, and the productions of the albums by Alex K (The Last Drive). The next  album, Just a Burn (2004), was the last that Argy played the drums, although the band had a drummer (Costas, a.k.a. Digital Alchemist) for the live shows. This album was a big opportunity to grow the bands' fan base, and its success was a big step for their next album Superfreak (2009) which was released by the American label MeteorCity.

The band itself usually rejects the "stoner rock" label.

They have played live both in Greece and have toured Europe and appeared in various festivals, while supporting bands such as The Last Drive, Deus ex Machina and Uriah Heep etc. In 2016 a tribute album saw the light under the "Children Of The Grave" name with bands like Tonia, Heritage or Demolition Train playing their tunes.

The most recent of Nightstalker's 3-decade career has seen the band become more prolific, with the release of albums 'Dead Rock Commandos' in 2012, 'As Above, So Below' in 2016, and most recently 'Great Hallucinations' in 2019. And while the worldwide pandemic doesn't currently allow, Nightstalker look forward to getting back on road to continue touring extensively; a medium that since day one has been at the forefront of Nightstalker's musical language, a celebration of all things loud.

Discography 
 SideFx (1994 Hitch Hyke)
 Use (1996 FM Records)
 The Ritual (2000 Vinylust)
 Just a Burn (2004 Mad Prophet Records)
 Superfreak  (2009 Meteor City)
 Dead Rock Commandos (2012 Small Stone Records)
 As Above, So Below (2016 Oak Island Records)
 Great Hallucinations (2019 Heavy Psych Sounds)

References

External links 

Greek stoner rock musical groups
Musical groups established in 1989